Tetraphenylmethane is an organic compound consisting of a methane core with four phenyl substituents. It was first synthesized by Moses Gomberg in 1898.

Synthesis 
Gomberg's classical organic synthesis shown below starts by reacting triphenylmethyl bromide 1 with phenylhydrazine 2 to the hydrazine 3. Oxidation with nitrous acid then produces the azo compound 4 from which on heating above the melting point, nitrogen gas evolves with formation of tetraphenylmethane 5.

Gomberg was able to distinguish this compound from triphenylmethane (elemental analysis was not an option given the small differences in the hydrogen fractions of 6.29% and 6.60%) by nitration of 5 with nitric acid to 6. A strong base would be able to abstract the methine proton of the nitrated triphenylmethyl compound if present, forming a strongly colored compound.

He obtained further evidence for the formation of tetraphenylmethane by reducing the nitro groups to amino groups with zinc dust in acetic acid to the leuco dye 7, which on exposure to hydrochloric acid eliminates aniline to the known compound pararosaniline 8.

Gomberg's success in synthesizing tetraphenylmethane set him on the attempt to prepare the next homologue hexaphenylethane, which led him to the discovery of the triphenylmethyl radical.

See also
 Triphenylmethane
 Toluene

References 

Aromatic hydrocarbons
Phenyl compounds